"Children of the Night" is a song written and recorded by Richard Marx, issued as the sixth and final single from his second album Repeat Offender. The song peaked at #13 on the Billboard Hot 100 in 1990, and was written in support of the suburban Los Angeles (Van Nuys)-based organization for runaways.

Composition

In a 2018 interview with Songfacts, Marx said:

Track listing
All songs written Richard Marx and produced by Marx and David Cole.

 "Children of the Night" – 4:10
 "Real World" [Live at The Palace Theatre] – 4:12

Personnel 
 Richard Marx – lead and backing vocals 
 Michael Omartian – keyboards, acoustic piano 
 C.J. Vanston – keyboards 
 Michael Landau – guitars, guitar solo 
 Randy Jackson – bass 
 Prairie Prince – drums 
 Paulinho da Costa – percussion 
 Tom Scott – sax solo 
 Larry Williams – saxophones 
 Gary Grant – trumpet 
 Jerry Hey – trumpet
 Dick Marx – horn arrangements 
 Shelley Cole – backing vocals
 Kevin Cronin – backing vocals
 Larry Gatlin – backing vocals
 Rudy Gatlin – backing vocals
 Steve Gatlin – backing vocals
 Ruth Marx – backing vocals
 Gene Miller – backing vocals
 Cynthia Rhodes – backing vocals 
 Don Shelton – backing vocals
 Terry Williams – backing vocals
 The Children of the Night – choir

Charts

Weekly charts

Year-end charts

References

1989 songs
1990 singles
Richard Marx songs
Songs written by Richard Marx